The list of non-marine molluscs of Mozambique is a list of freshwater and land species that form a part of the molluscan fauna of Mozambique (wildlife of Mozambique).

The terrestrial malacofauna of Mozambique is underreported and under-collected. As a result, on the whole exact data are scarce.

For example, there are known 46 species of terrestrial gastropods from Cabo Delgado Province, north-eastern corner of Mozambique, 28 species of terrestrial gastropods from Gorongosa National Park including its surroundings.

Freshwater gastropods 

Neritidae
 Neritina natalensis Reeve, 1855

Paludomidae
 Cleopatra ferruginea (I. & H. C. Lea, 1850)
 Cleopatra hemmingi (Verdcourt, 1956)
 Cleopatra nsendweensis Dupuis & Putzeys, 1902 – uncertain presence

Viviparidae
 Bellamya capillata (Frauenfeld, 1865)
 Bellamya jeffreysi (Frauenfeld, 1865)
 Bellamya robertsoni Frauenfeld, 1865

Bithyniidae
 Gabbiella kisalensis (Pilsbry & Bequaert, 1927)

Planorbidae
 Africanogyrus coretus (de Blainville, 1826)
 Bulinus africanus (Krauss, 1848)
 Bulinus forskalii (Ehrenberg, 1831)
 Bulinus globosus (Morelet, 1866)
 Bulinus natalensis (Küster, 1841)
 Bulinus reticulatus Mandahl-Barth, 1954
 Bulinus tropicus (Krauss, 1848)
 Burnupia caffra (Krauss, 1848)
 Ceratophallus natalensis (Krauss, 1848)
 Ferrissia junodi Connolly, 1925
 Gyraulus costulatus (Krauss, 1848)
 Lentorbis carringtoni (de Azevedo et al., 1961)
 Lentorbis junodi (Connolly, 1922)
 Segmentorbis angustus (Jickeli, 1874)
 Segmentorbis kanisaensis (Preston, 1914)

Assimineidae
 Assiminea bifasciata Nevill, 1880
 Eussoia leptodonta Nevill, 1881 – freshwater or marine species

Ellobiidae
 Cassidula labrella (Deshayes, 1830)

Thiaridae
 Melanoides nodicincta (Dohrn, 1865)
 Melanoides nyassana (Smith, 1877)
 Melanoides pergracilis (Von Martens, 1897)
 Melanoides tuberculata (O. F. Müller, 1774)
 Melanoides victoriae (Dorhn, 1865)

Ampullariidae
 Pila ovata (Olivier, 1808)
 Lanistes ellipticus Martens, 1866
 Lanistes nasutus Mandahl-Barth, 1972
 Lanistes nyassanus Dohrn, 1865
 Lanistes ovum Peters, 1845
 Lanistes solidus Smith, 1877

Lymnaeidae
 Radix natalensis (Krauss, 1848)

Land gastropods 

Pomatiidae
 Tropidophora anceps (Von Martens, 1878)
 Tropidophora insularis (Pfeiffer, 1852) / Tropidophora transvaalensis (Melvill & Ponsonby, 1895)
 Tropidophora ligata (Müller, 1774)

Succineidae
 Oxyloma patentissima (Pfeiffer, 1853)

Cerastidae
 Rachis jejuna (Melvill & Ponsonby, 1893)
 Rachis sp.
 Rhachistia sticta (Von Martens, 1859)

Achatinidae
 Achatina vassei Germain, 1918
 A. immaculata Lamarck, 1822
 Achatina cf. craveni E.A. Smith, 1881

Subulinidae
 Homorus manueli Preston, 1910
 Curvella nyasana E. A. Smith, 1899
 Curvella whytei E.A. Smith, 1899
 Pseudoglessula boivini (Morelet, 1860)
 Pseudoglessula cressyi Connolly, 1925
 Pseudoglessula kirki (Dohrn, 1865)

Streptaxidae
 Gonaxis cressyi Connolly, 1922
 Gonaxis elongatus (Fulton, 1899)
 Gonaxis gwandaensis (Preston, 1912)
 Streptostele inconspicua Van Bruggen, 1964
 Gulella lawrencei Van Bruggen, 1964
 Gulella sexdentata (Von Martens, 1869)

Charopidae
 Trachycystis sylvicola Van Bruggen & Verdcourt, 1965

Helicarionidae
 Sitala jenynsi (Pfeiffer, 1845)

Urocyclidae
 Atoxon sp.
 Zingis brunneofasciata Verdcourt, 1961
 Trochonanina bloyeti Bourguignat, 1889
 Trochonanina elatior (Von Martens, 1866)
 Trochonanina mozambicensis (Pfeiffer, 1855)

Bivalves 
Unionidae
 Unio caffer Krauss, 1848
 Coelatura hypsiprymna (Haas, 1936)
 Coelatura mossambicensis (von Martens, 1860)

Iridinidae (or Mutelidae)
 Chambardia petersii (Martens, 1860)
 Chambardia wahlbergi (Krauss, 1848)

Corbiculidae
 Corbicula astartina von Martens, 1860

Sphaeriidae
 Pisidium pirothi Jickeli, 1881

See also 
 List of marine molluscs of Mozambique

Lists of molluscs of surrounding countries:
 List of non-marine molluscs of Tanzania
 List of non-marine molluscs of Malawi
 List of non-marine molluscs of Zambia
 List of non-marine molluscs of Zimbabwe
 List of non-marine molluscs of South Africa
 List of non-marine molluscs of Eswatini

overseas:
 List of non-marine molluscs of Madagascar
 List of non-marine molluscs of Mayotte
 List of non-marine molluscs of the Seychelles

References 
This article incorporates CC-BY-3.0 text from the reference.

Non marine moll

Molluscs, Non
Mozambique, Non
Mozambique